Counterfeit (stylised as COUNTERFEIT.) were an English punk rock band from London, England, formed in 2015, consisting of lead vocalist and guitarist Jamie Campbell Bower, guitarist Sam Bower, guitarist Tristan Marmont, bassist Roland Johnson and drummer James Craig.

The band signed to Xtra Mile Recordings on 28 November 2016. Their debut album Together We Are Stronger was released on 17 March 2017. The band signed to Republic Records in 2019 and released the singles "It Gets Better", "The New Insane" and "11:44", which were to have been from their second album.

On 11 November 2020, Jamie Bower announced the dissolution of the band on their Instagram page.

Band members
Past Members
 Jamie Campbell Bower – lead vocalist, guitar (2015–2020)
 Roland Johnson – bass, vocals (2015–2020)
 Tristan Marmont – guitar, vocals (2015–2020)
 Sam Bower – guitar, vocals (2015–2020)
 Jimmy Craig – drums, percussion (2015–2020)

Timeline

Awards
AIM Awards
The AIM Independent Music Awards shines a spotlight on the UK's independent music industry, presented annually by Association of Independent Music.

|-
|rowspan="1"| 2017 ||rowspan="1"| Counterfeit || Best Live Act || 

KERRANG! Awards
The Kerrang! Awards is an annual music awards show in the United Kingdom, founded by the music magazine, Kerrang!.

|-
|rowspan="1"| 2017 ||rowspan="1"| Counterfeit || Best British Newcomer ||

Discography
Studio album
 Together We Are Stronger (2017)
Extended plays
 Come Get Some (2015)
 Enough (2016)
Addiction (2016)

Singles

 It Gets Better (2019)
 The New Insane (2020)
 11:44 (2020)
 Getting Over It (2020)

References

External links

 
 
 Counterfeit on Xtra Mile Recordings

English punk rock groups